was the lead ship of the 19-vessel s built for the Imperial Japanese Navy in the late-1930s under the Circle Three Supplementary Naval Expansion Program (Maru San Keikaku).

Design and description
The Kagerō-class destroyers were outwardly almost identical to the preceding light cruiser-sized , with improvements made by Japanese naval architects to improve stability and to take advantage of Japan’s lead in torpedo technology. They were designed to accompany the Japanese main striking force and in both day and night attacks against the United States Navy as it advanced across the Pacific Ocean, according to Japanese naval strategic projections. Despite being one of the most powerful classes of destroyers in the world at the time of their completion, only one survived the Pacific War.

Their crew numbered 240 officers and enlisted men. The ships had two Kampon geared steam turbines, each driving one propeller shaft, using steam provided by three Kampon water-tube boilers.

The main armament of the Kagerō class consisted of six Type 3  guns in three twin-gun turrets, one superfiring pair aft and one turret forward of the superstructure. They were built with four Type 96  anti-aircraft guns in two twin-gun mounts, but more of these guns were added over the course of the war. The ships were also armed with eight  torpedo tubes for the oxygen-fueled Type 93 "Long Lance" torpedo in two quadruple traversing mounts; one reload was carried for each tube. Their anti-submarine weapons comprised 16 depth charges.

Construction and career
Kagerō was laid down at the Maizuru Naval Arsenal on 3 September 1937. The ship was launched on 27 September 1938 and commissioned on 6 November 1939.

At the time of the attack on Pearl Harbor, Kagerō, was assigned to Destroyer Division 18 (Desdiv 18), and a member of Destroyer Squadron 2 (Desron 2) of the IJN 2nd Fleet, and had deployed from Etorofu in the Kurile Islands, as part of the escort for Admiral Nagumo’s Carrier Strike Force. She returned to Kure on 24 December.

She returned with Shōkaku from Palau to Yokosuka on 3 February, and spent the following month in training patrols. On 17 March, she departed Yokosuka with Shōkaku and Zuikaku to Staring-baai in Sulawesi, Netherlands East Indies.

Kagerō departed Staring-baai on 27 March to escort the carrier force in the Indian Ocean raid. After the Japanese air strikes on Colombo and Trincomalee in Ceylon, she returned to Kure for repairs on 23 April. She deployed from Saipan on 3 June as part of the escort for the troop convoy in the Battle of Midway.

On 5 July, she was assigned to escort the transport Kikukawa Maru to Kiska in the Aleutian Islands on a supply mission, and on 8 August assisted in towing the damaged destroyer  back to Japan. On 20 July, she was reassigned to Desdiv 15, Desron 2, still within the IJN 2nd Fleet.

In mid-August, Kagerō escorted the cruiser  to Truk, and continued on from Truk on a high speed transport run to Guadalcanal. For the remainder of 1942 and into February 1943, she was assigned to patrols from Guadalcanal towards Shortland, and to numerous “Tokyo Express" high speed transport operations in the Solomon Islands. During this period, she fought at the Battle of the Eastern Solomons, Battle of Santa Cruz, Naval Battle of Guadalcanal, and Battle of Tassafaronga

In mid-February 1943, Kagerō  returned with the aircraft carrier  via Truk to Kure for repairs. In mid-March Kagerō, Junyō and  returned to Truk, and Kagerō continued on to Shortlands, arriving on 24 April. After making a troop transport run from Rabaul to Kolombangara on 7 May  Kagerō  was disabled by a naval mine while leaving Vila port. Barely able to maneuver, she was then attacked by Allied aircraft and sank southwest of Rendova . On  Kagerō , 18 crewmen were killed and 36 were wounded. Kagerō  was removed from the navy list on 20 June 1943.

See also 
 List of ships of the Japanese Navy

Notes

Books

External links
 CombinedFleet.com: Kagero-class destroyers
 CombinedFleet.com: Kagero history

Kagerō-class destroyers
World War II destroyers of Japan
Destroyers sunk by aircraft
Shipwrecks in the Solomon Sea
1938 ships
Ships built by Maizuru Naval Arsenal
Maritime incidents in May 1943
Ships sunk by US aircraft